The 2006 Troy Trojans football team represented Troy University as a member of the Sun Belt Conference during the 2006 NCAA Division I FBS football season. Led by 16th-year head coach Larry Blakeney, the Trojans compiled an overall record of 8–5 with a mark of 6–1 in conference play, sharing the Sun Belt title with Middle Tennessee. This was the program's first Sun Belt championship since joining the conference two years prior, in 2004. Troy was invited to the New Orleans Bowl, where they played Rice of Conference USA, routing the Owls by a score of 41–17. The team played home games at Movie Gallery Stadium in Troy, Alabama.

Schedule

References

Troy
Troy Trojans football seasons
Sun Belt Conference football champion seasons
New Orleans Bowl champion seasons
Troy Trojans football